In the 2012–13 season, The Millers competed in League Two-the fourth tier in the football league. It was the 142nd season for the club since forming in 1870 as Thornhill and the fifth season in a row that Rotherham have been in League Two. It was a commemorative season for Rotherham United and a new chapter in the history books, as they returned home to Rotherham. They played their home games at The Don Valley Stadium in nearby city Sheffield, of which they had been shadowed by for 4 years since the dispute with Ken Booth, the owner of traditional home Millmoor-which forced them to leave. Rotherham's first game of the season was played on 18 August 2012, versus Burton Albion, in their new home; which was requested by chairman Tony Stewart because of the homecoming occasion. They came out victorious 3–0. Before the season began, the club were tipped by many bookies to lift the League Two title, leaving newly promoted Fleetwood Town and local rivals Chesterfield in their tracks. United were also tipped to be one of numerous favourites to contest the Football League Trophy, however they were out in the first round prior to a 1–0 defeat to York City.

Just one week prior to the first league encounter, Rotherham faced a trip to Yorkshire rivals, Hull City, in a League Cup first round fixture. They were knocked out 7-6 on penalties.

Rotherham United won promotion to League One after finishing second in the league.

Kit

Rotherham wear traditional colours red and white as their home kit. On the right shoulder, there is a solid white bar, with the black Puma logo on it, due to them being the kit manufacturers. Below it is the town crest, put on as a symbolic representative of the move back to Rotherham. It retains the sponsorship of local shopping centre Parkgate. The away kit is an amber and black coloured strip. The reason behind the chosen colours is that in 1925, when Rotherham Town and Thornhill United merged to become Rotherham United, their first ever kit was amber with a black rugby-like 'V' design on the chest. However, this season's away top is a thick, black bar across the chest, with the badge on the left, Puma logo in the centre and the town crest on the right. This kit also retains sponsorship from last season, with One Town One Community.

Season fixtures

Pre-season
 
The first training session of the season was held on week commencing 2 July 2012, 13 days previous to the first pre-season fixture against local team Parkgate. It was a vital time, as the players got a long jog and light training to get back into the football routine; as well as meeting the summer recruitments. On 14 July 2012, a few hours after the 0-6 victory against Parkgate, The Millers flew out to a training camp in the Algarve District of Portugal. On 18 July 2012, Rotherham locked horns with nearby training Oldham Athletic. Managed by Paul Dickov, Oldham were a stature of whom were a League One side. Surprisingly, Steve Evans' men came out on top 3–1. The players returned home the next day to prepare for the upcoming pre-season.

For Rotherham, not just the club but the fans too, this was a special pre-season. The first ever match at their new home venue The New York Stadium would be staged during this period of time. However, this match was just one quarter of stadia safety certificate matches. The opponents in these games, of which were two Yorkshire rivals in Barnsley and Doncaster Rovers, would stage 6,000 and 9,000 maximum capacity matches respectively. The 2012 Scottish Cup champions Hearts, and local rivals Sheffield United would both stage maximum (12,000) capacity matches, also respectively. These fixtures were simply to ensure that the facilities of the ground were able to cope with match-day standards.

Other games included away trips to Mansfield Town, Stocksbridge Park Steels, Stamford, a short journey to local lads Dinnington Town, and an encounter at Nene Park against Kettering Town.

Rotherham fans grew ever confident that the club would be successful this year. The performances were "too good for the league" according to many fans, and it was justified with victories over higher league outfits Oldham, Doncaster and Barnsley. Comments from other supporters suggested that the players brought in were Championship quality, and would tear other teams such as Barnet and Accrington Stanley to pieces.

FA Cup

League Cup

Football League Trophy

Squad statistics
Everything below is not up-to-date

Out on Loan

Goals, Appearances and Disciplinary

Key
x+x
Starts plus substitute appearances

Top scorers

Transfers

Competitions

Classification

Results by round

Overall

Coverage
Throughout the season, Rotherham will feature on many highlight shows. BBC's Football League Show will show highlights of every Football League game played on a Saturday, sometimes doing special segments-in which The Millers featured in when they beat Burton Albion 3–0 on the first day of the season.  A weekly post-match program on Sky Sports News, called Goals Express, also shows goals from the matches. Local radio station BBC Radio Sheffield sometimes do commentary, and 6 days a week hold the Football Heaven phone in, and after matches fans are able to call and express their opinions. Rotherham may be on Sky Sports sometimes, and if the club were to progress far in a domestic cup then they may have matches on BBC or ITV. Millers Player also host commentary and match stats during games, for under 10p a day the buyer is treated to exclusive information that can only be seen via the player.

References

2012-13
2012–13 Football League Two by team